Raychev is a Bulgarian surname. Notable people with the surname include:

Alexander Raichev (1922–2003), Bulgarian music educator and composer
Ivan Raychev (born 1977), Bulgarian footballer
Valentin Raychev (born 1958), Bulgarian wrestler

Bulgarian-language surnames